Showtunes is the result of collaboration between Stephin Merritt with Chen Shi-zheng on three pieces of musical theatre; Orphan of Zhao (2003), Peach Blossom Fan (2004), and My Life as a Fairy Tale (2005). Select tracks from these are featured on this album.  It was released on Nonesuch Records on March 16, 2006 but was available from peer-to-peer networks from February 20, 2006. The remainder of songs from the shows were released exclusively through online music stores.

Reception

The album received generally favorable reviews from critics; on Metacritic, it has a score of 69 out of 100.

Track listing
"Theme from The Orphan of Zhao" – 00:59
"At Madam Plum's" [From Peach Blossom Fan] – 02:35
"The Top and the Ball" [From My Life as a Fairy Tale] – 01:49
"What a Fucking Lovely Day!" [From Orphan of Zhao] – 01:22
"Auntie Toothache" [From My Life as a Fairy Tale] – 02:48
"It's Hard to Be the Emperor" [From Peach Blossom Fan] – 01:08
"Sounds Expensive" [From Peach Blossom Fan] – 01:36
"The Red Shoes" [From My Life as a Fairy Tale] – 01:43
"Fan Dance Cha-Cha" [From Peach Blossom Fan] – 01:17
"The Little Maiden of the Sea" [From My Life as a Fairy Tale] – 03:53
"Ukulele Me!" [From Peach Blossom Fan] – 01:08
"Train Song" [From Orphan of Zhao] – 01:17
"The Little Hebrew Girl" [From My Life as a Fairy Tale] – 02:10
"Shall We Sing a Duet?" [From Peach Blossom Fan] – 00:55
"The Song of the Humble Serf" [From Orphan of Zhao] – 00:56
"The Collar and the Garter" [From My Life as a Fairy Tale] – 01:40
"Shall We Sing a Duet?" (Reprise) [From Peach Blossom Fan] – 01:38
"Sorry, Wrong Show" [From Peach Blossom Fan] – 01:41
"The Storks" [From My Life as a Fairy Tale] – 01:24
"In the Spring, When I Was Young" [From Orphan of Zhao] – 02:02
"The Ugly Little Duck" [From My Life as a Fairy Tale] – 03:41
"And He Would Say..." [From Peach Blossom Fan] – 03:02
"The World is Not Made of Flowers" [From Orphan of Zhao] – 01:14
"Behold the Lowly Centipede" [From Peach Blossom Fan] – 01:41
"In China, Said the Moon..." [From My Life as a Fairy Tale] – 03:37
"Hail! Son of Heaven" [From Peach Blossom Fan] – 01:06

References

2006 soundtrack albums
Stephin Merritt albums
Theatre soundtracks
Nonesuch Records soundtracks